Panxiosteidae is an extinct family of arthrodire placoderms that lived during the Devonian period.

Phylogeny
The family Panxiosteidae was erected by Wang in 1979. Members of the family are noted for showing morphologically intermediate traits between coccosteids and dunkleosteids. In the 2010 Carr & Hlavin phylogenetic study, Panxiosteidae was recognized as the sister taxon to the family Dunkleosteidae, which together comprised the superfamily Dunkleosteoidea (one of the three major clades of Eubrachythoraci).

The phylogeny of Panxiosteidae from the 2013 Zhu & Zhu study is shown in the cladogram below: 

However, the subsequent 2016 Zhu et al. study using a larger morphological dataset recovered Panxiosteidae well outside of Dunkleosteoidea, instead within Coccosteomorphi and then Coccosteoidea as the sister group of Coccosteidae, as shown in the cladogram below:

References 

Arthrodires
Placoderm families